Conrad Dunn is an American actor. He began his screen career with the role of Francis "Psycho" Soyer in Stripes (1981). Working for some ten years under the name George Jenesky, he achieved soap-opera stardom in Days of Our Lives as Nick Corelli, a misogynistic pimp who evolved from bad guy to romantic lead. He returned to the name Conrad Dunn and began working extensively in Canadian as well as U.S. film and television. He excels as a villain, and has found depth in such TV films as We the Jury (1996) and the miniseries The Last Don  (1997–1998). For two seasons he portrayed the freelance detective Saul Panzer in the A&E TV series Nero Wolfe (2001–2002).

Life and career
Born and raised in Los Angeles, Conrad Dunn studied at the American Academy of Dramatic Arts-Los Angeles and with Stella Adler in New York. After seeing him on the stage, a casting director asked him to read for the role of Francis "Psycho" Soyer in Stripes (1981), his first feature film.  His introductory speech, described by one reviewer as "Conrad Dunn's adroit tribute to Travis Bickle", was singled out by film critic Roger Ebert: "The movie has especially good writing in several scenes. My favorite comes near the beginning, during a session when recruits in the new platoon get to know one another. One obviously psycho draftee, who looks like Robert De Niro, quietly announces that if his fellow soldiers touch him, touch his stuff, or interfere in any way with his person or his privacy, he will quite simply be forced to kill them." The response from drill sergeant Hulka, played by Warren Oates—"Lighten up, Francis"—became a popular movie quote.

Taking the name George Jenesky, Dunn performed over seven seasons (1981–1990) in the NBC daytime soap opera, Days of Our Lives. His character, Nick Corelli, became a fan favorite, a despicable pimp who evolved into a romantic lead and one of the show's main characters. Nick's murder was one of the series' notable whodunits.

Dunn had his own theatre company, and his stage credits include a 1994 production of Edward Albee's The Zoo Story simultaneously performed in American Sign Language. "Notwithstanding the value of bringing this important work to a non-hearing audience, the energy of the gestures generated by the actors actually underscores the emotional impact of their fateful encounter," wrote Variety.

He has made numerous appearances in films and on television, frequently as the villain. In the mid-1990s he returned to the name Conrad Dunn and began working extensively in Canada as well as the U.S. Notable TV roles include an antagonistic juror in the USA Network film, We the Jury (1996), a remorseless mobster in two CBS miniseries (1997–1998) adapted from Mario Puzo's The Last Don, and the arch villain in the 2000 pilot for TNT's supernatural drama series Witchblade. In 2001 he joined the principal cast of the A&E TV series, Nero Wolfe (2001–2002), portraying the superlatively competent freelance detective Saul Panzer for two seasons. His later film appearances include Chicago (2001), Owning Mahowny (2003) and Ving Rhames' Animal 2 (2007).

Filmography

Notes

References

External links 

Male actors from Los Angeles
Living people
American male television actors
Year of birth missing (living people)
20th-century American male actors
21st-century American male actors
American male soap opera actors
American male film actors